The Clean Energy Finance Corporation (CEFC) is an Australian Government-owned Green Bank that was established to facilitate increased flows of finance into the clean energy sector.

The CEFC is responsible for investing $10 billion in clean energy projects on behalf of the Australian Government.  Its mission is to help lower Australia's carbon emissions by investing in renewable energy, energy efficiency and low emissions technologies across the economy, via a range of finance options.  

The CEFC also supports innovative start-up companies through the Clean Energy Innovation Fund and is investing in the development of Australia’s hydrogen potential through the Advancing Hydrogen Fund. Across its portfolio, the CEFC invests to deliver a positive return for taxpayers. 

The CEFC is governed by an independent board which has a statutory responsibility for decision-making, performance of the Corporation's functions and managing the CEFC's investments, and a Chief Executive Officer who is responsible for the day-to-day administration of the Corporation. A system of delegations exist to aid in the performance of these functions. The Board reports to Parliament through its Responsible Ministers.

Object and function 

The Clean Energy Finance Corporation Act 2012 establishes the CEFC, sets out the organisation’s purpose and functions, and establishes arrangements for the Board, CEO and staff. 

The object of the CEFC was extended to include a specific reference to its role in emissions abatement in 2022, with the introduction of the following language: “to facilitate the achievement of Australia’s greenhouse gas emissions reduction targets”. The change complements a continuation of the existing object of the CEFC, which is: “to facilitate the flows of finance into the clean energy sector.”   .

The main function of the CEFC is to invest, directly and indirectly, in clean energy technologies (the investment function).
 
The CEFC Act also specifies a number of other functions, including:
	
 Liaising with relevant individuals, businesses, agencies and State and Territory governments to facilitate the CEFC investment function
 Performance of any other functions conferred by the CEFC Act or any other Commonwealth law
 Anything incidental or conducive to the performance of the investment function or the other functions.

Clean energy technologies are broadly defined in the CEFC Act to be energy efficiency, renewable energy and low-emission technologies. The Act expressly excludes CEFC investment in carbon capture and storage, nuclear technology and nuclear power.

The CEFC is a corporate Commonwealth entity under the Public Governance, Performance and Accountability Act 2013 (PGPA Act). 

The CEFC has access to funding of $10 billion comprising annual appropriations to the CEFC Special Account of $2 billion every 1 July from 2013 to 2017 inclusive, in accordance with section 46 of the CEFC Act. The CEFC draws on this finance on an as needs basis, with non-committed funds remaining in the Special Account until required.

Investment Mandate 

An Investment Mandate direction is the means by which the Government of the day provides instruction as to how the Corporation may make investments, providing it:
  Does not have a purpose of directing the Corporation to require the corporation to make or not make a particular investment and
  Is not inconsistent with the CEFC Act, (including the object of the Act).

Under the CEFC Act, the CEFC Board must be consulted on the draft of a proposed new mandate, and any submission made by the Board must be tabled in the Parliament.

Investment strategy 
The CEFC works with businesses, institutional investors and innovative entrepreneurs to accelerate investment in Australia’s transition to net zero emissions. In operating within the parameters of the CEFC Act and Investment Mandate directions, the CEFC must also anticipate and respond to the environment and market conditions in which it operates. This means retreating where the private sector is operating effectively, and stepping up its investment activities to fill market gaps where the private sector is absent. The CEFC investment strategy is summarised as:

Backing the clean energy system of the future: Australia requires significant new investment to support a substantial uplift in renewable energy generation and storage. We’re investing in critical large-scale grid transmission projects, landmark battery storage, large-scale renewable energy developments and innovative bioenergy opportunities. 

Investing across the economic landscape: Investing in low emissions solutions in property, infrastructure, industry, natural capital and resources can deliver benefits right across the economy, from lower energy consumption to alternative approaches to production, reducing demand on the energy network and abating carbon emissions. 

Tapping into new investment models and opportunities: Developing new financial markets and products, building investor confidence and crafting tailored and innovative investment solutions for new and emerging industries to help Australia meet the challenges of decarbonisation and create a strong low emissions economy of the future.

Investment performance 

The CEFC marked 10 years of investment in 2022 and confirmed lifetime investment commitments of $10.76 billion. Together with institutional investors, business, industry and cleantech innovators, the CEFC said it had catalysed $37.15 billion in investment in Australia’s low emissions economy in its first 10 years. Expected lifetime emissions from CEFC investment commitments were more than 200 million tonnes of CO2-e at 30 June 2022, buoyed by landmark investments in the hard-to-abate manufacturing sector, which together are expected to eliminate some 900,000 tonnes of CO2-e annually.

All figures AUD

Board 
The CEFC Board Charter details the Board's role and responsibilities and its relationship with Management. The Audit and Risk Committee and the People and Culture Committee are the two standing Board Committees which assist the Board in its oversight role. The charters for the three Board Committee detail the leadership, composition and responsibilities of each Committee and how they exercise their authority. The Australian Government announced changes to the CEFC Board in 2022. 

The CEFC publishes quarterly reports on its website regarding investment commitments.

History 

The newly elected Albanese Labor Government in 2022 appointed the CEFC to take a leading role in delivery of its $20 billion Rewiring the Nation infrastructure program. Subject to parliamentary approval, the new funding would be the first injection of new capital to the CEFC in its 10-year history. The CEFC  said transforming our electricity grid was one of the most important investments needed for Australia to transition to net zero emissions, providing a critical pathway to bringing low-cost renewable energy to consumers.  

The CEFC was established under the Clean Energy Finance Corporation Act 2012, passed by the Parliament of Australia on 22 July 2012. It was established on 3 August 2012 and commenced making investment commitments from 1 July 2013.

On 5 August 2013 the federal Coalition Opposition led by Tony Abbott wrote to the CEFC asking it to stop making new loans and to cease assessing new projects. After the 2013 federal election, on 5 December 2013, then CEFC Chair Jillian Broadbent said on ABC Radio National that the government should "break an election promise" and keep the CEFC in operation, citing a 7% profit. Coalition Senator Arthur Sinodinos said that if it's making a profit, it should survive without the government and essentially confirmed the government would shut the corporation down. Legislation to abolish the CEFC and transfer the CEFC's existing assets and liabilities to the Commonwealth was put before Parliament but blocked by non-government senators in the Senate. In July 2015, Abbott announced he would ban the CEFC from investing in wind power and rooftop solar. On 13 July 2015, the CEFC said it was taking advice in relation to the draft Mandate.

In December 2015, Fairfax media reported that Prime Minister Malcolm Turnbull had lifted the ban on CEFC investment in wind power, in his first major break from the former regime's environmental policy. The Guardian reported on 24 December 2015 that the CEFC had been directed to focus on innovative and emerging technologies, reversing a mandate by the former prime minister Tony Abbott that would have specifically blocked funding for windfarms and small-scale solar projects.

In December 2018, an independent statutory review of the CEFC Act found that the CEFC had facilitated the flows of finance into the clean energy sector, with CEFC's investments successfully enabling projects that would not have otherwise proceeded, attracting substantial private co-investment to projects. The statutory review was conducted by Deloitte and tabled in Parliament on 14 December 2018. The CEFC submission to the Statutory Review of the Corporation is also publicly available.

In August 2019, Australian Prime Minister Scott Morrison was reported in The Australian newspaper as saying that: “The fact Australia leads the world in per capita investment in clean energy, we have the world’s most successful green bank in the Clean Energy Finance Corporation and that we’re on track to have around a quarter of our electricity needs met by renewables by 2020, all underscores the work underway to reduce our global emissions.”

Mr Ian Learmonth was appointed CEO in March 2017  In August 2017 Mr Steven Skala AO was appointed CEO Chair.  In marking the first decade of the CEFC, Mr Skala noted in a 2022 address at Parliament House in Canberra that while the CEFC was not created without controversy, it now enjoyed political support, and observed that the cornerstone of a strong economy was stable and affordable energy.

See also

Australian Renewable Energy Agency (ARENA)
Energy policy of Australia
National electricity market
Project finance
Power purchase agreement

References 

Climate change organisations based in Australia
Energy organizations
2012 establishments in Australia
Energy in Australia